The Nichols plot is a plot used in signal processing and control design, named after American engineer Nathaniel B. Nichols.

Use in control design
Given a transfer function,

with the closed-loop transfer function defined as,

the Nichols plots displays  versus . Thus, the frequency  is the parameter along the curve. This plot may be compared to the Bode plot in which the two inter-related graphs -  versus  and  versus ) - are plotted.

In feedback control design, the plot is useful for assessing the stability and robustness of a linear system.  This application of the Nichols plot is central to the quantitative feedback theory (QFT) of Horowitz and Sidi, which is a well known method for robust control system design.

In most cases,  refers to the phase of the system's response. Although similar to a Nyquist plot, a Nichols plot is plotted in a Cartesian coordinate system while a Nyquist plot is plotted in a Polar coordinate system.

See also
 Hall circles
 Bode plot
 Nyquist plot
 Transfer function

References

External links
 Mathematica function for creating the Nichols plot

Plots (graphics)
Signal processing
Classical control theory